Umemura is a Japanese surname. Notable people with the surname include:

, Japanese table tennis player
Hiroshi Umemura (fighter) (born 1972), Japanese mixed martial artist
, Japanese politician
, Japanese kunoichi

Japanese-language surnames